Westbury is a village and civil parish in northern Buckinghamshire, England, about  east of Brackley and  west of Buckingham. It is close to the A422 and the border with Oxfordshire.

The village was given by King Edward IV to the Company of Cooks in London, and has since been sold into private hands.

The parish church is St Augustine, a Grade II* listed building. The church dates back to the 13th century, though much restored in 1863. The church tower house four bells, one of which dates back to the 14th century.

The village is home to Beachborough School, a private prep school established originally in Hampshire in 1910, but relocated to Westbury in 1942 in the manor house.

The village has a website providing information regarding the services and events taking place in the village. www.westburyvillage.org

References

External links

Villages in Buckinghamshire
Civil parishes in Buckinghamshire